Ryan Lindgren (born February 11, 1998) is an American professional ice hockey defenseman for the  New York Rangers of the National Hockey League (NHL). He was picked in the second round (49th overall) of the 2016 NHL Entry Draft by the Boston Bruins. He was acquired by the Rangers as part of the trade that sent Rick Nash to the Bruins.

Playing career
Lindgren is a defensive defenseman who plays physically. He was drafted by the Bruins with the 49th pick in the 2nd round of the 2016 Entry Draft, a pick they received in exchange for Johnny Boychuk. On February 25, 2018, the New York Rangers acquired Ryan Lindgren along with a first-round pick in the 2018 NHL Entry Draft, forwards Ryan Spooner and Matt Beleskey, and a seventh-round pick in the 2019 NHL Entry Draft from the Boston Bruins in an exchange for forward Rick Nash. He signed a contract with the New York Rangers on March 22, 2018, and signed an ATO with their AHL affiliate, the Hartford Wolf Pack on March 23, 2018, forgoing his junior and senior years of collegiate hockey with the Minnesota Golden Gophers.

After spending the first half of the 2018–19 season with Hartford, he was called up by the Rangers for their January 15, 2019 game against the Carolina Hurricanes. He was returned to Hartford on January 19 after playing three games for the Rangers. On May 10, 2021, Lindgren signed a three-year contract with the Rangers.

International play

Lindgren represents the United States in international play. He began his international hockey career as the United States captain at the 2015 World U-17 Hockey Challenge, where he recorded one assist in 6 games as his team lost in. He captained America's team in the 2016 IIHF World U18 Championships, scoring 2 goals and adding 3 assists in 7 games, helping his team to third place. He was also on the United States gold-winning in the 2017 World Junior Championship, getting 1 assist in 7 games. Most recently, he was an alternate captain of the bronze-winning United States' team in the 2018 World Junior Championship, getting an assist in 7 games.

Personal life
Ryan Lindgren is the brother of Charlie Lindgren, a goaltender for the Washington Capitals.

Career statistics

Regular season and playoffs

International

Awards and honors

Players' Player Award
2021

References

External References
 

1998 births
Living people
American men's ice hockey defensemen
Boston Bruins draft picks
Hartford Wolf Pack players
Minnesota Golden Gophers men's ice hockey players
New York Rangers players
USA Hockey National Team Development Program players